was a Japanese actor and television personality.

Biography
Atō was born on 14 November 1946 in Odawara, Kanagawa. He attended Tokyo Metropolitan University, studying law.

Atō was found dead at his home in Shinjuku, Tokyo, on 15 November 2015, a day after his 69th birthday. His agency website lists his date of death as 14 November 2015, approximately at his 69th birthday.

Filmography

References

External links
 
 Agency profile 

1946 births
2015 deaths
Japanese television personalities
People from Odawara
Male actors from Kanagawa Prefecture